Arthur Fortant (June 14, 1829 - April 10, 1901) was a sergeant of the French Regiment of the Guard of the field artillery. He was a member of the first French Military Mission to Japan in 1867, in which he accompanied Jules Brunet. He worked as an instructor for artillery in the army of the shōgun.

With the advent of the Boshin War, and the declaration of neutrality of foreign powers, Fortant chose to resign from the French Army and continue the fight on the side of the Bakufu.

He participated to the Battle of Hakodate, in which he was head of one of the four Japanese regiments.

French soldiers
1829 births
1901 deaths
Meiji Restoration
People of the Boshin War